Bully's Acre is the site in Ballinalee in County Longford, Ireland where insurrectionists were executed by Lord Cornwallis.

The 1798 rebellion was inspired by the United Irishmen against British rule. Britain was united since the 1707 Act of Union between England and Scotland, and after the failure of the rebellion the Act of Union (1801) brought Ireland into the unitary state, previously being a separate entity under a common monarchy.

Geography of County Longford